Norman Swan  (born Norman Swirsky in 1953) is a Scottish-born Australian physician, journalist and broadcaster.

Life and career
Swan was born in Scotland as Norman Swirsky. He wanted to be an actor, but instead went to medical school at the University of Aberdeen graduating in 1976. He later tried unsuccessfully to attend the Royal Academy of Dramatic Art. He then continued his postgraduate studies by specialising in paediatrics.

Swan moved to Australia to continue his training but transitioned from medicine when he became a producer and broadcaster with the Australian Broadcasting Corporation in 1982. He was the general manager of ABC Radio National for three years from 1990 and in that time increased the audience by 30%. He overhauled the schedule, created the RN current affairs breakfast program and recruited Phillip Adams, Geraldine Doogue and Wendy Harmer as program presenters. Swan co-hosted the Radio National program Life Matters between 1996 and 2001, and has produced and presented ABC radio program The Health Report from its inception in 1985. And since March 202 has co-hosted Coronacast, a podcast about pandemics and the coronavirus.

On ABC TV, Swan has presented both Catalyst and Quantum, is an occasional reporter on Four Corners, including an exposé of egregious doctors' fees. He is currently a regular reporter and commentator on 7.30. On commercial television, he has appeared on the Australian version of The Biggest Loser as the resident health expert.

Swan was awarded the Gold Walkley in 1988 for revealing scientific fraud conducted by gynaecologist William McBride. Swan's investigation sent "shock waves throughout the medical world" and led to McBride's deregistration as a medical practitioner. Swan has won four Walkley Awards, (the latest in 2020 for Coronacast), the 2020 Australian Skeptics Award, a Media Peace Award from the United Nations Association of Australia and the highest honour in Australian science journalism, the Michael Daley Award. Swan was also awarded the Medal of The Australian Academy Science in 2004. He was elected a Fellow of the Australian Academy of Health and Medical Sciences in 2022.

He has published two books recently which became bestsellers:  So You Think You Know What's Good For You (2021 Hachette) and So You Want To Live Younger Longer (2022 Hachette).

He has three children, the oldest of whom is Jonathan Swan, who now is a reporter on The New York Times.

Personal life
Swan's son Jonathan is a political correspondent, firstly for The Sydney Morning Herald and The Age, then The Hill, Axios, and currently the New York Times. Swan's daughter Anna was seriously injured in an electric bike accident on a 2016 trip to Italy. Swan has experienced PTSD, blaming himself for not hiring helmets for the bikes, and also as a result of being injured in a bus explosion at age 14.

Swan was appointed as a Member the Order of Australia (AM) in the 2023 Australia Day Honours for "significant service to the broadcast media as a science and health commentator".

Bibliography

References

External links
 Swan's biography at ICMI

Walkley Award winners
Australian paediatricians
Medical journalists
Scottish emigrants to Australia
ABC radio (Australia) journalists and presenters
Australian radio producers
Cosmos (Australian magazine) people
Living people
1953 births
Australian people of Scottish-Jewish descent
Fellows of the Royal College of Physicians
Fellows of the Australian Academy of Health and Medical Sciences
Members of the Order of Australia